Mental Circus is the debut album from Bloodpit, a Finnish rock band. It was released on Beemvees/Playground Music in 2005.

Track list
"Bad Echo"
"In A Furnace"
"Platitude"
"Autumn"
"Bad-Ass Blues"
"For The Time Being"
"For The Days Of The End"
"Out To Find You"
"One More Time"
"The Juvenile Hell"
"February Day's Draught"

2005 albums